Vitaly Talabaev (ru)
 Andrey Talalakin (ru)
 Vladimir Tamgin (ru)
 Sergey Taranets (ru)
 Vasily Tarasov (ru)
 Yevgeny Tarelkin
 Igor Tarelkin (ru)
 Azamet Tasimov (ru)
 Roman Taskaev (ru)
 Vladimir Tatashvili (ru)
 Magomed Tashukhadzhiev (ru)
 Suren Tashchiev (ru)
 Andrey Teperik (ru)
 Mikhail Teplinsky (ru)
 Beslan Tepsaev (ru)
 Vladimir Terekhov (ru)
 Oleg Tereshkin (ru)
 Oleg Tibekin (ru)
 Konstantin Timerman (ru)
 Andrey Timoshenko (ru)
 Valery Tinkov (ru)
 Anatoly Titov (ru)
 Aleksandr Tikhonov (ru)
 Igor Tkachenko
 Valery Tokarev
 Vyacheslav Tokarev (ru)
 Magomed Tolboev
 Taygib Tolboev
 Dmitry Tormakhov (ru)
 Yuri Tregubenkov (ru)
 Sergey Treshchov
 Viktor Trofimenko (ru)
 Andrey Troshev (ru)
 Gennady Troshev
 Vladimir Trubanov (ru)
 Vyacheslav Trubnikov
 Yevgeny Trundaev (ru)
 Gennady Tsatsorin (ru)
 Sergey Tsvetov (ru)
 Vladimir Tsvetov (ru)
 Yuri Tsvetov (ru)
 Eduard Tseev (ru)
 Vasily Tsibliev
 Oleg Tsoy (ru)
 Aldar Tsydenzhapov
 Vitaly Tsymanovsky (ru)
 Sergey Tulin (ru)
 Leonty Tupitsyn (ru)
 Andrey Turkin (ru)
 Aleksey Tuchin (ru)
 Andrey Tyunin (ru)
 Viktor Tyurikov (ru)
 Mikhail Tyurin
 Aleksey Tyagachyov (ru)

References 

 

Heroes T